The 2010 CPISRA Football 7-a-side European Championships was the European championship for men's national 7-a-side association football teams. CPISRA stands for Cerebral Palsy International Sports & Recreation Association. Athletes with a physical disability competed. The Championship took place in Scotland from 17 to 28 August 2010.

Football 7-a-side was played with modified FIFA rules. Among the modifications were that there were seven players, no offside, a smaller playing field, and permission for one-handed throw-ins. Matches consisted of two thirty-minute halves, with a fifteen-minute half-time break. The Championships was a qualifying event for the 2011 CPISRA Football 7-a-side World Championships.

Participating teams and officials

Teams

The draw 
During the draw, the teams were divided into pots because of rankings. Here, the following groups:

Squads 
The individual teams contact following football gamblers on to:

Group A

Group B

Venues 
The venues to be used for the European Championships were located in Glasgow.

Format 

The first round, or group stage, was a competition between the 10 teams divided among two groups of five, where each group engaged in a round-robin tournament within itself. The two highest ranked teams in each group advanced to the knockout stage for the position one to four. The next two teams played for the position five to eight. The last teams played for the position nine to ten. Teams were awarded three points for a win and one for a draw. When comparing teams in a group over-all result came before head-to-head.

In the knockout stage there were two rounds (semi-finals, and the final). The winners plays for the higher positions, the losers for the lower positions. For any match in the knockout stage, a draw after 60 minutes of regulation time was followed by two 10 minute periods of extra time to determine a winner. If the teams were still tied, a penalty shoot-out was held to determine a winner.

Classification
Athletes with a physical disability competed. The athlete's disability was caused by a non-progressive brain damage that affects motor control, such as cerebral palsy, traumatic brain injury or stroke. Athletes must be ambulant.

Players were classified by level of disability.
 C5: Athletes with difficulties when walking and running, but not in standing or when kicking the ball.
 C6: Athletes with control and co-ordination problems of their upper limbs, especially when running.
 C7: Athletes with hemiplegia.
 C8: Athletes with minimal disability; must meet eligibility criteria and have an impairment that has impact on the sport of football.

Teams must field at least one class C5 or C6 player at all times. No more than two players of class C8 are permitted to play at the same time.

Group stage 
The first round, or group stage, have seen the ten teams divided into two groups of five teams.

Group A

Group B

Knockout stage

Semi-finals 
Position 5-8

Position 1-4

Finals 
Position 9-10

Position 7-8

Position 5-6

Position 3-4

Final

Statistics

Ranking

See also

References

External links 
 2010 European Championships Glasgow
 Cerebral Palsy International Sports & Recreation Association (CPISRA)
 International Federation of Cerebral Palsy Football (IFCPF)

2010 in association football
2010
2010–11 in Scottish football
Paralympic association football
2010s in Glasgow